William G. Smith House is a historic plantation house and national historic district located near Bullock, Granville County, North Carolina.  It was built about 1790, and is a Georgian / Federal style dwelling consisting of a central two-story block flanked by one-story wings. Also on the property is a contributing smokehouse.

It was listed on the National Register of Historic Places in 1988.

References

Plantation houses in North Carolina
Houses on the National Register of Historic Places in North Carolina
Historic districts on the National Register of Historic Places in North Carolina
Georgian architecture in North Carolina
Federal architecture in North Carolina
Houses completed in 1790
Houses in Granville County, North Carolina
National Register of Historic Places in Granville County, North Carolina